Fürchtegott Theodor Kirchner (10 December 1823 – 18 September 1903) was a German composer and pianist of the Romantic era.

Musical career
Kirchner enjoyed the friendship and admiration of many leading composers of the 19th century yet was unable to maintain a successful career, apparently due to a disordered way of life which included extravagant spending and an addiction to gambling.

He was born at Neukirchen near Chemnitz and at the age of eight was already an accomplished organist and pianist. From 1838 to 1842, he studied in Leipzig under J. Knorr (piano) and K. F. Becker (organ and theory).  Kirchner subsequently was a pupil of J. Schneider in Dresden and attended the Leipzig Conservatory for a short time. In 1843, he became organist in Winterthur, Switzerland on the recommendation of Mendelssohn.  He remained there for nearly 20 years, but travelled much in Germany, befriending Robert and Clara Schumann and Brahms.  Clara Schumann was very fond of him, though she wrote that 'in his character there is no stability', and it appears they had a discreet affair in the early 1860s.  In 1862, Kirchner moved to Zürich as the director of the subscription concerts there. This only lasted three years.

From 1862 to 1872, Kirchner taught in the music school at Zürich. He was married in 1868, but the marriage was not a success.  After a spell from 1870 as organist in Zurich, he moved to Meiningen in 1872 to become court pianist; he was made director of the Conservatory in Würzburg the next year, serving until 1875. From 1876–1883, he lived in Leipzig, then taught score-reading in Dresden until 1890. In 1884, Brahms, Hanslick, Gade, Grieg and Hans von Bülow raised 30,000 marks to enable Kirchner to pay off his debts.  In 1890, he abandoned his wife and family and moved to Hamburg, where he was looked after by a former pupil. Two strokes left him paralysed in 1894, and he became completely blind in his last years. He died in Hamburg, on 18 September 1903.

Kirchner was esteemed by, amongst others, Mendelssohn, Robert Schumann (who wrote approvingly of him in Neue Zeitschrift für Musik), Brahms, Liszt, Wagner, Dvořák, and Grieg.

Compositions and arrangements
He was a gifted arranger whose transcriptions include the realization of Brahms's two string sextets as piano trios; he also made the vocal score of Brahms's German Requiem and solo piano arrangements of the third and fourth sets of Hungarian Dances and the Liebeslieder Walzer. As a composer, he was an intense romantic lyricist and a natural miniaturist—he is credited with having written over 1000 piano pieces (mainly collected in cycles) of which many are only a minute or so in duration—a kind of 19th-century forerunner of Webern's Bagatelles. His waltzes, opus 23, composed in 1876, are dedicated to Brahms and the suite of 'characteristic pieces', Nachtbilder, opus 25 quotes Brahms's song Wie bist du, meine Königin. There are also some organ pieces and songs and a few choral and chamber works, but no orchestral music at all, though his friend Heinrich Schülz-Beuthen made an orchestral suite out of some of Kirchner's piano pieces. He was especially influenced by Robert Schumann's music.

Kirchner's complete works are being published by Amadeus in Winterthur.

See also
List of compositions by Theodor Kirchner

References

External links

Theodor Kirchner Works for Piano Trio-sound-bites

1823 births
1903 deaths
19th-century classical composers
19th-century classical pianists
19th-century German composers
19th-century conductors (music)
German classical organists
German classical pianists
German conductors (music)
German male classical composers
German male conductors (music)
German male pianists
German Romantic composers
Male classical pianists
German male organists
20th-century German male musicians
Male classical organists
19th-century organists